Struma (village) is a village in Sandanski municipality, Blagoevgrad Province, Bulgaria.

References

Villages in Blagoevgrad Province